Chloe McCarron (born 22 December 1997) is a Northern Irish professional footballer who plays as a midfielder for Northern Ireland. She previously played for Mid-Ulster, Linfield Ladies and Birmingham City, before signing for Glentoran in July 2021

McCarron currently has 12 caps for Northern Ireland, scoring 1 goal.

Club career 
In August 2020, McCarron signed a two-year contract with English FA WSL side Birmingham City. She made 12 appearances in all competitions before mutually terminating her contract in April 2021 in order to return to Northern Ireland for personal reasons.

International career 
McCarron has been capped for the Northern Ireland national team, appearing for the team during the 2019 FIFA Women's World Cup qualifying cycle.

Career statistics

Club

International 

 As of 3 February 2021

 As of goal scored on 1 December 2020
 Scores and results list Northern Ireland's goal tally first, score column indicates score after each McCarron goal.

References

External links
 
 
 

1997 births
Living people
Women's association footballers from Northern Ireland
Northern Ireland women's international footballers
Women's association football midfielders
Women's Super League players
Birmingham City W.F.C. players
Linfield Ladies F.C. players
Women's Premiership (Northern Ireland) players
UEFA Women's Euro 2022 players